Ahmad Galal is an Egyptian footballer. He currently plays as a striker for Egypt's Arab Contractors SC.

Career
Galal came to prominence on 27 January 2007 in the Egyptian Soccer Cup when, despite only playing in the second half of the game, he scored a hat-trick against Talkha Electricity Club. Al Ahly wound up winning the game 3-0.

In the summer of 2007, Galal joined the Egyptian side El-Masry and scored a goal in his debut against Al Ahly in the Egyptian Premier League.

External links
 Download Galal's Hat-trick against Talka Electricity, Egyptian Cup

1985 births
Living people
Egyptian footballers
Al Ahly SC players
Al Masry SC players
Association football forwards
People from Sharqia Governorate
Ittihad El Shorta SC players
Egyptian Premier League players